Algerita is an unincorporated community in San Saba County, in the U.S. state of Texas. According to the Handbook of Texas, the community had a population of 48 in 2000.

History
Charles Cadwaleder Yarborough opened a general store and a post office near Richland Creek in 1885. It was located four miles north of the present location. It was named for the algerita shrubs in the area. The post office remained in operation until 1890. A railroad track was built by the Gulf, Colorado and Santa Fe Railway several miles from the town in 1907, thus Algerita moved to this area. Another post office was established here by Walter Thomas in 1914. The community began its decline when the railroad depot closed and was demolished since ranchers refused to open lanes for their cattle across their land. Its population was recorded as 20 in 1925 and increased to 60 in 1949. That year, it had a church and a combination store and gas station. The population dipped to 25 in 1952 then grew to 48 in 2000.

Geography

Education
Algerita had its own school in 1949. Today the community is served by the San Saba Independent School District.

References

Unincorporated communities in San Saba County, Texas
Unincorporated communities in Texas